Illinois Route 177 is an east–west state road in southern Illinois. It runs from Illinois Route 13 in Belleville to U.S. Route 51 in Irvington.

Route description 

History 
SBI Route 177 originally ran from New Minden to Okawville. It was extended east to Irvington in 1937, replacing Route 153.  In 1967, it was extended west to Belleville on an old routing of Illinois Route 15.

Major Intersections

References

External links

177
Transportation in St. Clair County, Illinois
Transportation in Washington County, Illinois
Transportation in Clinton County, Illinois